Lisiate Maikeli Lavulo (14 August 1961 – 25 April 2018) was a Tongan boxer. He competed in the men's light welterweight event at the 1984 Summer Olympics.

References

External links
 

1961 births
2018 deaths
Light-welterweight boxers
Tongan male boxers
Olympic boxers of Tonga
Boxers at the 1984 Summer Olympics
Place of birth missing